Klappe die 2te is the second studio album by German all-female pop-rap band Tic Tac Toe, released in 1997 by RCA Records. The lyrics and music were written by the band's manager Claudia Wohlfromm, her then-husband Torsten Börger, who also produced the album, and the band itself. The title translates The Second Take.

The album spawned four singles, including the number-one "Warum?", arguably the band's biggest hit, and the international top 10 single "Mr. Wichtig". Klappe die 2te topped the charts in Germany and Switzerland, where it was certified double platinum, and has reportedly sold over 1.1 million copies in Germany alone as of 1998.

Track listing

Charts

Weekly charts

Year-end charts

Certifications

References 

1997 albums
German-language albums
Tic Tac Toe (band) albums